Wang Kemin (born August 1957) is a retired Chinese politician and educator. He previously served as vice-chairman of the Standing Committee of the Hunan Provincial People's Congress, head of Education Department of Hunan government, head of Science and Technology Department of Hunan government, and president of Hunan University.

Wang was a member of the 15th and 17th National People's Congress.

Biography
Wang was born and raised in Ningxiang County, Hunan. He joined the Communist Party of China in November 1985. He received his doctor's degree from Hunan University in 1987. After college, he taught there. From February 1989 to January 1991 he studied at ETH Zurich as a postdoctor. He joined the chemical engineering faculty of Hunan University in January 1991 and was promoted to professor in 1992. He served as dean of Hunan University's College of Chemical Engineering from October 1996 to March 1997 and the university's vice-president from March 1997 to September 1997. In September 1997 he was appointed executive vice president of Hunan University. After this office was terminated in May 1999, he became its president, serving until April 2003.

In February 2003 he was promoted to become head of Science and Technology Department of Hunan Government, a position he held until September 2011, when he was appointed head of Education Department of Hunan Government.

On January 30, 2016, he was installed as vice-chairman of the Standing Committee of the Hunan Provincial People's Congress at the Fifth Plenary Meeting of the Twelfth People's Congress of Hunan.

Honor
He was honored as a Distinguished Young Scholar by the National Science Fund for Distinguished Young Scholars in 1998.

References

External links

 

 

  

 

1957 births
People from Ningxiang
Living people
Hunan University alumni
ETH Zurich alumni
Academic staff of Hunan University
Presidents of Hunan University
Chinese Communist Party politicians from Hunan
Political office-holders in Hunan
People's Republic of China politicians from Hunan
Politicians from Changsha